Sphenopsis is a genus of  warbler-like birds in the tanager family Thraupidae. They are found in highland forest of South America.

Taxonomy and species list
The four species now placed in this genus were formerly assigned to the genus Hemispingus. A molecular phylogenetic study published in 2014 found that Hemispingus was polyphyletic and as part of the subsequent rearrangement, the genus Sphenopsis was resurrected for these four species. The genus had been introduced in 1862 by the English zoologist Philip Sclater with the type species as Sphenopsis ignobilis, a taxon that is now treated as a subspecies of the oleaginous hemispingus. The name Sphenopsis combines the Ancient Greek sphēn meaning "wedge" with opsis meaning "appearance". 

The four species in the genus are:

References

 
Bird genera
Taxa named by Philip Sclater